Lars "Kuprik" Bäckman  (born 5 June 1945) is a chef who lives in Leksand, Sweden.

Bäckman was brought up in the Swedish town of Rättvik, where, as a child, he helped out in his parents' hotel. His interest for food led him to attend restaurant training, after which he worked in numerous restaurants around Sweden.

When he was 21 years old, he left for the United States to help his friend start a restaurant called "Viking Horn" and known informally as "the horny Viking". It was situated in the outskirts of Beverly Hills.  After the "Viking Horn" he became head chef of a Holiday Inn hotel and later, head chef at 20th Century Fox.

Bäckman was asked to do a commercial for Swedish food in a show that later became Good Morning America. It was supposed to be a live show, where he cooked and explained his cooking to a program host who was supposed to ask questions and guide the process along.  However, the host never showed up and Bäckman had to attempt the taping on his own.  In his words:

"I was so nervous. I was shaking and didn't know what to do. And all the time I was mumbling strange words. At first the audience was surprised of the idiot that, sweating like a pig, stood before them. But after a while they started to laugh."

Currently, Bäckman is travelling around Sweden while cooking, telling jokes and singing in shopping malls, at company parties and similar arrangements.  He also records TV-commercials for Siljan Food, and working on his own logotype. Additionally, Bäckman does promotions with IKEA in the United Kingdom.

According to his own site, Bäckman believes that he was the inspiration for the Muppet character "The Swedish Chef"; however, Bäckman acknowledges that Muppet writer Jerry Juhl denies this contention.

References

External links
Lars "Kuprik" Bäckman Official Site
Bäckman's official site, in partnership with IKEA

Swedish chefs
Living people
1945 births